The following is a list of county roads in Putnam County, Florida.  All county roads are maintained by the county in which they reside; however, not all of them are marked with standard MUTCD approved county road shields.

List of County Roads in Putnam County, Florida

References

FDOT Map of Putnam County
FDOT GIS data, accessed January 2014

 
County